Mercury is a chemical element with the symbol Hg and atomic number 80. A heavy, silvery d-block element, mercury is the only metallic element that is known to be liquid at standard temperature and pressure; the only other element that is liquid under these conditions is the halogen bromine, though metals such as caesium, gallium, and rubidium melt just above room temperature.

Mercury occurs in deposits throughout the world mostly as cinnabar (mercuric sulfide). The red pigment vermilion is obtained by grinding natural cinnabar or synthetic mercuric sulfide.

Mercury is used in thermometers, barometers, manometers, sphygmomanometers, float valves, mercury switches, mercury relays, fluorescent lamps and other devices, though concerns about the element's toxicity have led to mercury thermometers and sphygmomanometers being largely phased out in clinical environments in favor of alternatives such as alcohol- or galinstan-filled glass thermometers and thermistor- or infrared-based electronic instruments. Likewise, mechanical pressure gauges and electronic strain gauge sensors have replaced mercury sphygmomanometers. The mercury cell process (chlor-alkali) is used to produce chlorine and sodium or potassium hydroxide, but is phased out. 

Mercury, and mercury compounds, remain in use in scientific research applications and in amalgam for dental restoration in some locales, and in some food manufacturing operations.  In food manufacturing, mercuric chloride is used in the starch extraction process during rice, corn, and wheat refining to inhibit starch degrading enzymes. It is also used in fluorescent lighting. Electricity passed through mercury vapor in a fluorescent lamp produces short-wave ultraviolet light, which then causes the phosphor in the tube to fluoresce, making visible light.

Mercury poisoning can result from exposure to water-soluble forms of mercury (such as mercuric chloride or methylmercury), by inhalation of mercury vapor, or by ingesting any form of mercury. In serious form, it is also known as Minamata disease. Mercury poisoning is intensified with lead co-exposures. Concurrent mercury and lead exposures are considered one risk factor for autism.

Properties

Physical properties

Mercury is a heavy, silvery-white metal that is liquid at room temperature. Compared to other metals, it is a poor conductor of heat, but a fair conductor of electricity.

It has a freezing point of −38.83 °C and a boiling point of 356.73 °C, both the lowest of any stable metal, although preliminary experiments on copernicium and flerovium have indicated that they have even lower boiling points. This effect is due to lanthanide contraction and relativistic contraction reducing the radius of the outermost electrons, and thus weakening the metallic bonding in mercury. Upon freezing, the volume of mercury decreases by 3.59% and its density changes from 13.69 g/cm3 when liquid to 14.184 g/cm3 when solid. The coefficient of volume expansion is 181.59 × 10−6 at 0 °C, 181.71 × 10−6 at 20 °C and 182.50 × 10−6 at 100 °C (per °C). Solid mercury is malleable and ductile and can be cut with a knife.

Chemical properties
Mercury does not react with most acids, such as dilute sulfuric acid, although oxidizing acids such as concentrated sulfuric acid and nitric acid or aqua regia dissolve it to give sulfate, nitrate, and chloride. Like silver, mercury reacts with atmospheric hydrogen sulfide. Mercury reacts with solid sulfur flakes, which are used in mercury spill kits to absorb mercury (spill kits also use activated carbon and powdered zinc).

Amalgams

Mercury dissolves many metals such as gold and silver to form amalgams. Iron is an exception, and iron flasks have traditionally been used to trade mercury. Several other first row transition metals with the exception of manganese, copper and zinc are also resistant in forming amalgams. Other elements that do not readily form amalgams with mercury include platinum. Sodium amalgam is a common reducing agent in organic synthesis, and is also used in high-pressure sodium lamps.

Mercury readily combines with aluminium to form a mercury-aluminium amalgam when the two pure metals come into contact. Since the amalgam destroys the aluminium oxide layer which protects metallic aluminium from oxidizing in-depth (as in iron rusting), even small amounts of mercury can seriously corrode aluminium. For this reason, mercury is not allowed aboard an aircraft under most circumstances because of the risk of it forming an amalgam with exposed aluminium parts in the aircraft.

Mercury embrittlement is the most common type of liquid metal embrittlement.

Isotopes

There are seven stable isotopes of mercury, with  being the most abundant (29.86%). For the synthesis of precious metals two stable mercury isotopes are of potential interest: the trace isotope  and the more abundant .

Etymology

"Hg" is the modern chemical symbol for mercury. Like the English name quicksilver ("living-silver"), this name was due to mercury's liquid and shiny properties.

The modern English name "mercury" comes from the planet Mercury. In medieval alchemy, the seven known metals—quicksilver, gold, silver, copper, iron, lead, and tin—were associated with the seven planets. Quicksilver was associated with the fastest planet, which had been named after the Roman god Mercury, who was associated with speed and mobility. The astrological symbol for the planet became one of the alchemical symbols for the metal, and "Mercury" became an alternative name for the metal. Mercury is the only metal for which the alchemical planetary name survives, as it was decided it was preferable to "quicksilver" as a chemical name.

History
The mercury compound known as cinnabar was recorded as a component of the red pigments in Paleolithic cave paintings of 30,000 years ago in Spain and France.

Mercury was found in Egyptian tombs that date from 1500 BC.

In China and Tibet, mercury use was thought to prolong life, heal fractures, and maintain generally good health, although it is now known that exposure to mercury vapor leads to serious adverse health effects. The first emperor of a unified China, Qín Shǐ Huáng Dì—allegedly buried in a tomb that contained rivers of flowing mercury on a model of the land he ruled, representative of the rivers of China—was reportedly killed by drinking a mercury and powdered jade mixture formulated by Qin alchemists intended as an elixir of immortality. Khumarawayh ibn Ahmad ibn Tulun, the second Tulunid ruler of Egypt (r. 884–896), known for his extravagance and profligacy, reportedly built a basin filled with mercury, on which he would lie on top of air-filled cushions and be rocked to sleep.

In November 2014 "large quantities" of mercury were discovered in a chamber 60 feet below the 1800-year-old pyramid known as the "Temple of the Feathered Serpent," "the third largest pyramid of Teotihuacan," Mexico along with "jade statues, jaguar remains, a box filled with carved shells and rubber balls".

Aristotle recounts that Daedalus made a wooden statue of Venus move by pouring quicksilver in its interior. In Greek mythology Daedalus gave the appearance of voice in his statues using quicksilver. The ancient Greeks used cinnabar (mercury sulfide) in ointments; the ancient Egyptians and the Romans used it in cosmetics. In Lamanai, once a major city of the Maya civilization, a pool of mercury was found under a marker in a Mesoamerican ballcourt. By 500 BC mercury was used to make amalgams (Medieval Latin amalgama, "alloy of mercury") with other metals.

Alchemists thought of mercury as the First Matter from which all metals were formed. They believed that different metals could be produced by varying the quality and quantity of sulfur contained within the mercury. The purest of these was gold, and mercury was called for in attempts at the transmutation of base (or impure) metals into gold, which was the goal of many alchemists.

The mines in Almadén (Spain), Monte Amiata (Italy), and Idrija (now Slovenia) dominated mercury production from the opening of the mine in Almadén 2500 years ago, until new deposits were found at the end of the 19th century.

On 8 April 1911, Heike Kamerlingh Onnes found that at 4.2 K a solid mercury wire immersed in liquid helium became superconductive.

Occurrence

Mercury is an extremely rare element in Earth's crust, having an average crustal abundance by mass of only 0.08 parts per million (ppm). Because it does not blend geochemically with those elements that constitute the majority of the crustal mass, mercury ores can be extraordinarily concentrated considering the element's abundance in ordinary rock. The richest mercury ores contain up to 2.5% mercury by mass, and even the leanest concentrated deposits are at least 0.1% mercury (12,000 times average crustal abundance). It is found either as a native metal (rare) or in cinnabar, metacinnabar, sphalerite, corderoite, livingstonite and other minerals, with cinnabar (HgS) being the most common ore. Mercury ores often occur in hot springs or other volcanic regions.

Beginning in 1558, with the invention of the patio process to extract silver from ore using mercury, mercury became an essential resource in the economy of Spain and its American colonies. Mercury was used to extract silver from the lucrative mines in New Spain and Peru. Initially, the Spanish Crown's mines in Almadén in Southern Spain supplied all the mercury for the colonies. Mercury deposits were discovered in the New World, and more than 100,000 tons of mercury were mined from the region of Huancavelica, Peru, over the course of three centuries following the discovery of deposits there in 1563. The patio process and later pan amalgamation process continued to create great demand for mercury to treat silver ores until the late 19th century.

Former mines in Italy, the United States and Mexico, which once produced a large proportion of the world supply, have now been completely mined out or, in the case of Slovenia (Idrija) and Spain (Almadén), shut down due to the fall of the price of mercury. Nevada's McDermitt Mine, the last mercury mine in the United States, closed in 1992.

Mercury is extracted by heating cinnabar in a current of air and condensing the vapor. The equation for this extraction is
HgS + O2 → Hg + SO2

In 2022, China was the top producer of mercury, providing 91% of the world output (2000 out of 2200 tonnes), followed by Tajikistan (120 t), Mexico (40 t), Peru (30 t) and Norway (20 t). 

Because of the high toxicity of mercury, both the mining of cinnabar and refining for mercury are hazardous and historic causes of mercury poisoning. In China, prison labor was used by a private mining company as recently as the 1950s to develop new cinnabar mines. Thousands of prisoners were used by the Luo Xi mining company to establish new tunnels. Worker health in functioning mines is at high risk.

A newspaper claimed that an unidentified European Union directive calling for energy-efficient lightbulbs to be made mandatory by 2012 encouraged China to re-open cinnabar mines to obtain the mercury required for CFL bulb manufacture. Environmental dangers have been a concern, particularly in the southern cities of Foshan and Guangzhou, and in Guizhou province in the southwest.

Abandoned mercury mine processing sites often contain very hazardous waste piles of roasted cinnabar calcines. Water run-off from such sites is a recognized source of ecological damage. Former mercury mines may be suited for constructive re-use. For example, in 1976 Santa Clara County, California purchased the historic Almaden Quicksilver Mine and created a county park on the site, after conducting extensive safety and environmental analysis of the property.

Chemistry

All known mercury compounds exhibit one of two positive oxidation states: I and II.  Experiments have failed to unequivocally demonstrate any higher oxidation states: both the claimed 1976 electrosynthesis of an unstable Hg(III) species and 2007 cryogenic isolation of HgF4 have disputed interpretations and remain difficult (if not impossible) to reproduce.

Compounds of mercury(I)
Unlike its lighter neighbors, cadmium and zinc, mercury usually forms simple stable compounds with metal-metal bonds. Most mercury(I) compounds are diamagnetic and feature the dimeric cation, Hg. Stable derivatives include the chloride and nitrate. Mercury(I) chloride, a colorless solid also known as calomel, is really the compound with the formula Hg2Cl2, with the connectivity Cl-Hg-Hg-Cl. It is a standard in electrochemistry. It reacts with chlorine to give mercuric chloride, which resists further oxidation. Mercury(I) hydride, a colorless gas, has the formula HgH, containing no Hg-Hg bond.

Indicative of its tendency to bond to itself, mercury forms mercury polycations, which consist of linear chains of mercury centers, capped with a positive charge.

Compounds of mercury(II)
Mercury(II) is the most common oxidation state and is the main one in nature as well. All four mercuric halides are known. They form tetrahedral complexes with other ligands but the halides adopt linear coordination geometry, somewhat like Ag+ does. Best known is mercury(II) chloride, an easily sublimating white solid. HgCl2 forms coordination complexes that are typically tetrahedral, e.g. .

Mercury(II) oxide, the main oxide of mercury, arises when the metal is exposed to air for long periods at elevated temperatures. It reverts to the elements upon heating near 400 °C, as was demonstrated by Joseph Priestley in an early synthesis of pure oxygen. Hydroxides of mercury are poorly characterized, as they are for its neighbors gold and silver.

Being a soft metal, mercury forms very stable derivatives with the heavier chalcogens. Preeminent is mercury(II) sulfide, HgS, which occurs in nature as the ore cinnabar and is the brilliant pigment vermillion. Like ZnS, HgS crystallizes in two forms, the reddish cubic form and the black zinc blende form. The latter sometimes occurs naturally as metacinnabar. Mercury(II) selenide (HgSe) and mercury(II) telluride (HgTe) are also known, these as well as various derivatives, e.g. mercury cadmium telluride and mercury zinc telluride being semiconductors useful as infrared detector materials.

Mercury(II) salts form a variety of complex derivatives with ammonia. These include Millon's base (Hg2N+), the one-dimensional polymer (salts of )), and "fusible white precipitate" or [Hg(NH3)2]Cl2. Known as Nessler's reagent, potassium tetraiodomercurate(II) is still occasionally used to test for ammonia owing to its tendency to form the deeply colored iodide salt of Millon's base.

Mercury fulminate is a detonator widely used in explosives.

Organomercury compounds

Organic mercury compounds are historically important but are of little industrial value in the western world. Mercury(II) salts are a rare example of simple metal complexes that react directly with aromatic rings. Organomercury compounds are always divalent and usually two-coordinate and linear geometry. Unlike organocadmium and organozinc compounds, organomercury compounds do not react with water. They usually have the formula HgR2, which are often volatile, or HgRX, which are often solids, where R is aryl or alkyl and X is usually halide or acetate. Methylmercury, a generic term for compounds with the formula CH3HgX, is a dangerous family of compounds that are often found in polluted water. They arise by a process known as biomethylation.

Applications

Mercury is used primarily for the manufacture of industrial chemicals or for electrical and electronic applications. It is used in some liquid-in-glass thermometers, especially those used to measure high temperatures. A still increasing amount is used as gaseous mercury in fluorescent lamps, while most of the other applications are slowly being phased out due to health and safety regulations. In some applications, mercury is replaced with less toxic but considerably more expensive Galinstan alloy.

Medicine

Mercury and its compounds have been used in medicine, although they are much less common today than they once were, now that the toxic effects of mercury and its compounds are more widely understood. An example of the early therapeutic application of mercury of was published in 1787 by James Lind.

Mercury is an ingredient in dental amalgams. Thiomersal (called Thimerosal in the United States) is an organic compound used as a preservative in vaccines, though this use is in decline. Thiomersal is metabolized to ethyl mercury. Although it was widely speculated that this mercury-based preservative could cause or trigger autism in children, scientific studies showed no evidence supporting any such link. Nevertheless, thiomersal has been removed from, or reduced to trace amounts in all U.S. vaccines recommended for children 6 years of age and under, with the exception of inactivated influenza vaccine.

Another mercury compound, merbromin (Mercurochrome), is a topical antiseptic used for minor cuts and scrapes that is still in use in some countries.

Mercury in the form of one of its common ores, cinnabar, is used in various traditional medicines, especially in traditional Chinese medicine. Review of its safety has found that cinnabar can lead to significant mercury intoxication when heated, consumed in overdose, or taken long term, and can have adverse effects at therapeutic doses, though effects from therapeutic doses are typically reversible. Although this form of mercury appears to be less toxic than other forms, its use in traditional Chinese medicine has not yet been justified, as the therapeutic basis for the use of cinnabar is not clear.

Today, the use of mercury in medicine has greatly declined in all respects, especially in developed countries. Thermometers and sphygmomanometers containing mercury were invented in the early 18th and late 19th centuries, respectively. In the early 21st century, their use is declining and has been banned in some countries, states and medical institutions. In 2002, the U.S. Senate passed legislation to phase out the sale of non-prescription mercury thermometers. In 2003, Washington and Maine became the first states to ban mercury blood pressure devices. Mercury compounds are found in some over-the-counter drugs, including topical antiseptics, stimulant laxatives, diaper-rash ointment, eye drops, and nasal sprays. The FDA has "inadequate data to establish general recognition of the safety and effectiveness" of the mercury ingredients in these products. Mercury is still used in some diuretics although substitutes now exist for most therapeutic uses.

Production of chlorine and caustic soda
Chlorine is produced from sodium chloride (common salt, NaCl) using electrolysis to separate the metallic sodium from the chlorine gas. Usually the salt is dissolved in water to produce a brine. By-products of any such chloralkali process are hydrogen (H2) and sodium hydroxide (NaOH), which is commonly called caustic soda or lye. By far the largest use of mercury in the late 20th century was in the mercury cell process (also called the Castner-Kellner process) where metallic sodium is formed as an amalgam at a cathode made from mercury; this sodium is then reacted with water to produce sodium hydroxide. Many of the industrial mercury releases of the 20th century came from this process, although modern plants claimed to be safe in this regard. After about 1985, all new chloralkali production facilities that were built in the United States used membrane cell or diaphragm cell technologies to produce chlorine.

Laboratory uses
Some medical thermometers, especially those for high temperatures, are filled with mercury; they are gradually disappearing. In the United States, non-prescription sale of mercury fever thermometers has been banned since 2003.

Some transit telescopes use a basin of mercury to form a flat and absolutely horizontal mirror, useful in determining an absolute vertical or perpendicular reference. Concave horizontal parabolic mirrors may be formed by rotating liquid mercury on a disk, the parabolic form of the liquid thus formed reflecting and focusing incident light. Such liquid-mirror telescopes are cheaper than conventional large mirror telescopes by up to a factor of 100, but the mirror cannot be tilted and always points straight up.

Liquid mercury is a part of popular secondary reference electrode (called the calomel electrode) in electrochemistry as an alternative to the standard hydrogen electrode. The calomel electrode is used to work out the electrode potential of half cells. Last, but not least, the triple point of mercury, −38.8344 °C, is a fixed point used as a temperature standard for the International Temperature Scale (ITS-90).

In polarography both the dropping mercury electrode and the hanging mercury drop electrode use elemental mercury. This use allows a new uncontaminated electrode to be available for each measurement or each new experiment.

Mercury-containing compounds are also of use in the field of structural biology. Mercuric compounds such as mercury(II) chloride or potassium tetraiodomercurate(II) can be added to protein crystals in an effort to create heavy atom derivatives that can be used to solve the phase problem in X-ray crystallography via isomorphous replacement or anomalous scattering methods.

Niche uses
Gaseous mercury is used in mercury-vapor lamps and some "neon sign" type advertising signs and fluorescent lamps. Those low-pressure lamps emit very spectrally narrow lines, which are traditionally used in optical spectroscopy for calibration of spectral position. Commercial calibration lamps are sold for this purpose; reflecting a fluorescent ceiling light into a spectrometer is a common calibration practice. Gaseous mercury is also found in some electron tubes, including ignitrons, thyratrons, and mercury arc rectifiers. It is also used in specialist medical care lamps for skin tanning and disinfection. Gaseous mercury is added to cold cathode argon-filled lamps to increase the ionization and electrical conductivity. An argon-filled lamp without mercury will light incorrectly and have dull spots. Lighting containing mercury can be bombarded/oven-pumped only once. When added to neon filled tubes, the light produced will have inconsistent red/blue spots until the initial burning-in process is completed; eventually, it will light a consistent, dull, off-blue color.

The Deep Space Atomic Clock (DSAC) under development by the Jet Propulsion Laboratory utilises mercury in a linear, ion-trap-based clock. This novel use of mercury allows very compact atomic clocks with low energy requirements, and is therefore ideal for space probes and Mars missions.

Cosmetics
Mercury, as thiomersal, is widely used in the manufacture of mascara. In 2008, Minnesota became the first state in the United States to ban intentionally added mercury in cosmetics, giving it a tougher standard than the federal government.

A study in geometric mean urine mercury concentration identified a previously unrecognized source of exposure (skin care products) to inorganic mercury among New York City residents. Population-based biomonitoring also showed that mercury concentration levels are higher in consumers of seafood and fish meals.

Skin whitening
Mercury is effective as an active ingredient in skin whitening compounds used to depigment skin.   The Minamata Convention on Mercury limits the concentration of mercury in such whiteners to 1 part per million.  However, as of 2022, many commercially sold whitener products continue to exceed that limit, and are considered toxic.

Firearms
Mercury(II) fulminate is a primary explosive which is mainly used as a primer of a cartridge in firearms.

Historic uses

Many historic applications made use of the peculiar physical properties of mercury, especially as a dense liquid and a liquid metal:
 Quantities of liquid mercury ranging from  have been recovered from elite Maya tombs (100–700 AD) or ritual caches at six sites. This mercury may have been used in bowls as mirrors for divinatory purposes. Five of these date to the Classic Period of Maya civilization (c. 250–900) but one example predated this.
 In Islamic Spain, it was used for filling decorative pools. Later, the American artist Alexander Calder built a mercury fountain for the Spanish Pavilion at the 1937 World Exhibition in Paris. The fountain is now on display at the Fundació Joan Miró in Barcelona.
 Mercury was used inside wobbler lures. Its heavy, liquid form made it useful since the lures made an attractive irregular movement when the mercury moved inside the plug. Such use was stopped due to environmental concerns, but illegal preparation of modern fishing plugs has occurred.
 The Fresnel lenses of old lighthouses used to float and rotate in a bath of mercury which acted like a bearing.
 Mercury sphygmomanometers (blood pressure meter), barometers, diffusion pumps, coulometers, and many other laboratory instruments took advantage of mercury's properties as a very dense, opaque liquid with a nearly linear thermal expansion.
 As an electrically conductive liquid, it was used in mercury switches (including home mercury light switches installed prior to 1970), tilt switches used in old fire detectors, and tilt switches in some home thermostats.
 Owing to its acoustic properties, mercury was used as the propagation medium in delay-line memory devices used in early digital computers of the mid-20th century.
 Experimental mercury vapor turbines were installed to increase the efficiency of fossil-fuel electrical power plants. The South Meadow power plant in Hartford, CT employed mercury as its working fluid, in a binary configuration with a secondary water circuit, for a number of years starting in the late 1920s in a drive to improve plant efficiency. Several other plants were built, including the Schiller Station in Portsmouth, NH, which went online in 1950. The idea did not catch on industry-wide due to the weight and toxicity of mercury, as well as the advent of supercritical steam plants in later years.
 Similarly, liquid mercury was used as a coolant for some nuclear reactors; however, sodium is proposed for reactors cooled with liquid metal, because the high density of mercury requires much more energy to circulate as coolant.
 Mercury was a propellant for early ion engines in electric space propulsion systems. Advantages were mercury's high molecular weight, low ionization energy, low dual-ionization energy, high liquid density and liquid storability at room temperature. Disadvantages were concerns regarding environmental impact associated with ground testing and concerns about eventual cooling and condensation of some of the propellant on the spacecraft in long-duration operations. The first spaceflight to use electric propulsion was a mercury-fueled ion thruster developed at NASA Glenn Research Center and flown on the Space Electric Rocket Test "SERT-1" spacecraft launched by NASA at its Wallops Flight Facility in 1964. The SERT-1 flight was followed up by the SERT-2 flight in 1970. Mercury and caesium were preferred propellants for ion engines until Hughes Research Laboratory performed studies finding xenon gas to be a suitable replacement. Xenon is now the preferred propellant for ion engines as it has a high molecular weight, little or no reactivity due to its noble gas nature, and has a high liquid density under mild cryogenic storage.

Other applications made use of the chemical properties of mercury:
 The mercury battery is a non-rechargeable electrochemical battery, a primary cell, that was common in the middle of the 20th century. It was used in a wide variety of applications and was available in various sizes, particularly button sizes. Its constant voltage output and long shelf life gave it a niche use for camera light meters and hearing aids. The mercury cell was effectively banned in most countries in the 1990s due to concerns about the mercury contaminating landfills.
 Mercury was used for preserving wood, developing daguerreotypes, silvering mirrors, anti-fouling paints (discontinued in 1990), herbicides (discontinued in 1995), interior latex paint, handheld maze games, cleaning, and road leveling devices in cars. Mercury compounds have been used in antiseptics, laxatives, antidepressants, and in antisyphilitics.
 It was allegedly used by allied spies to sabotage Luftwaffe planes: a mercury paste was applied to bare aluminium, causing the metal to rapidly corrode; this would cause structural failures.
 Chloralkali process: The largest industrial use of mercury during the 20th century was in electrolysis for separating chlorine and sodium from brine; mercury being the anode of the Castner-Kellner process. The chlorine was used for bleaching paper (hence the location of many of these plants near paper mills) while the sodium was used to make sodium hydroxide for soaps and other cleaning products. Although this usage has largely been discontinued and replaced with other technologies that utilize membrane cells, the World Chlorine Council Report indicates there were still eleven manufacturing plants operating in North and South America in 2020.
 As electrodes in some types of electrolysis, batteries (mercury cells), sodium hydroxide and chlorine production, handheld games, catalysts, insecticides.
 Mercury was once used as a gun barrel bore cleaner.
 From the mid-18th to the mid-19th centuries, a process called "carroting" was used in the making of felt hats. Animal skins were rinsed in an orange solution (the term "carroting" arose from this color) of the mercury compound mercuric nitrate, Hg(NO3)2·2H2O. This process separated the fur from the pelt and matted it together. This solution and the vapors it produced were highly toxic. The United States Public Health Service banned the use of mercury in the felt industry in December 1941. The psychological symptoms associated with mercury poisoning inspired the phrase "mad as a hatter". Lewis Carroll's "Mad Hatter" in his book Alice's Adventures in Wonderland was a play on words based on the older phrase, but the character himself does not exhibit symptoms of mercury poisoning.
 Gold and silver mining. Historically, mercury was used extensively in hydraulic gold mining in order to help the gold to sink through the flowing water-gravel mixture. Thin gold particles may form mercury-gold amalgam and therefore increase the gold recovery rates. Large-scale use of mercury stopped in the 1960s. However, mercury is still used in small scale, often clandestine, gold prospecting. It is estimated that 45,000 metric tons of mercury used in California for placer mining have not been recovered. Mercury was also used in silver mining.

Historic medicinal uses
Mercury(I) chloride (also known as calomel or mercurous chloride) has been used in traditional medicine as a diuretic, topical disinfectant, and laxative. Mercury(II) chloride (also known as mercuric chloride or corrosive sublimate) was once used to treat syphilis (along with other mercury compounds), although it is so toxic that sometimes the symptoms of its toxicity were confused with those of the syphilis it was believed to treat. It is also used as a disinfectant. Blue mass, a pill or syrup in which mercury is the main ingredient, was prescribed throughout the 19th century for numerous conditions including constipation, depression, child-bearing and toothaches. In the early 20th century, mercury was administered to children yearly as a laxative and dewormer, and it was used in teething powders for infants. The mercury-containing organohalide merbromin (sometimes sold as Mercurochrome) is still widely used but has been banned in some countries such as the U.S.

Toxicity and safety

Mercury and most of its compounds are extremely toxic and must be handled with care; in cases of spills involving mercury (such as from certain thermometers or fluorescent light bulbs), specific cleaning procedures are used to avoid exposure and contain the spill. Protocols call for physically merging smaller droplets on hard surfaces, combining them into a single larger pool for easier removal with an eyedropper, or for gently pushing the spill into a disposable container. Vacuum cleaners and brooms cause greater dispersal of the mercury and should not be used. Afterwards, fine sulfur, zinc, or some other powder that readily forms an amalgam (alloy) with mercury at ordinary temperatures is sprinkled over the area before itself being collected and properly disposed of. Cleaning porous surfaces and clothing is not effective at removing all traces of mercury and it is therefore advised to discard these kinds of items should they be exposed to a mercury spill.

Mercury can be absorbed through the skin and mucous membranes and mercury vapors can be inhaled, so containers of mercury are securely sealed to avoid spills and evaporation. Heating of mercury, or of compounds of mercury that may decompose when heated, should be carried out with adequate ventilation in order to minimize exposure to mercury vapor. 

The most toxic forms of mercury are its organic compounds, such as dimethylmercury and methylmercury.  Inorganic mercury, by itself, however, is especially toxic with co-exposures to lead during child development. Exposures to inorganic mercury are linked to the development of type-2 diabetes in the human population. Mercury can cause both chronic and acute poisoning.

Dietary exposures to mercury 
In 2021, the United States Congress released a report on the problem of heavy metals in baby foods, including mercury and lead. Scholars have studied the effects of dietary inorganic mercury exposure from processed food consumption.

Releases in the environment

Preindustrial deposition rates of mercury from the atmosphere may be about 4 ng /(1 L of ice deposit). Although that can be considered a natural level of exposure, regional or global sources have significant effects. Volcanic eruptions can increase the atmospheric source by 4–6 times.

Natural sources, such as volcanoes, are responsible for approximately half of atmospheric mercury emissions. The human-generated half can be divided into the following estimated percentages:
 65% from stationary combustion, of which coal-fired power plants are the largest aggregate source (40% of U.S. mercury emissions in 1999). This includes power plants fueled with gas where the mercury has not been removed. Emissions from coal combustion are between one and two orders of magnitude higher than emissions from oil combustion, depending on the country.
 11% from gold production. The three largest point sources for mercury emissions in the U.S. are the three largest gold mines. Hydrogeochemical release of mercury from gold-mine tailings has been accounted as a significant source of atmospheric mercury in eastern Canada.
 6.8% from non-ferrous metal production, typically smelters.
 6.4% from cement production.
 3.0% from waste disposal, including municipal and hazardous waste, crematoria, and sewage sludge incineration.
 3.0% from caustic soda production.
 1.4% from pig iron and steel production.
 1.1% from mercury production, mainly for batteries.
 2.0% from other sources.
The above percentages are estimates of the global human-caused mercury emissions in 2000, excluding biomass burning, an important source in some regions.

Recent atmospheric mercury contamination in outdoor urban air was measured at 0.01–0.02 μg/m3. A 2001 study measured mercury levels in 12 indoor sites chosen to represent a cross-section of building types, locations and ages in the New York area. This study found mercury concentrations significantly elevated over outdoor concentrations, at a range of 0.0065 – 0.523 μg/m3. The average was 0.069 μg/m3.

Artificial lakes, or reservoirs, may be contaminated with mercury due to the absorption by the water of mercury from submerged trees and soil.
For example, Williston Lake in northern British Columbia, created by the damming of the Peace River in 1968, is still sufficiently contaminated with mercury that it is inadvisable to consume fish from the lake. Permafrost soils have accumulated mercury through atmospheric deposition, and permafrost thaw in cryospheric regions is also a mechanism of mercury release into lakes, rivers, and wetlands.

Mercury also enters into the environment through the improper disposal (e.g., land filling, incineration) of certain products. Products containing mercury include: auto parts, batteries, fluorescent bulbs, medical products, thermometers, and thermostats. Due to health concerns (see below), toxics use reduction efforts are cutting back or eliminating mercury in such products. For example, the amount of mercury sold in thermostats in the United States decreased from 14.5 tons in 2004 to 3.9 tons in 2007.

Most thermometers now use pigmented alcohol instead of mercury. Mercury thermometers are still occasionally used in the medical field because they are more accurate than alcohol thermometers, though both are commonly being replaced by electronic thermometers and less commonly by galinstan thermometers. Mercury thermometers are still widely used for certain scientific applications because of their greater accuracy and working range.

Historically, one of the largest releases was from the Colex plant, a lithium isotope separation plant at Oak Ridge, Tennessee. The plant operated in the 1950s and 1960s. Records are incomplete and unclear, but government commissions have estimated that some two million pounds of mercury are unaccounted for.

A serious industrial disaster was the dumping of waste mercury compounds into Minamata Bay, Japan, between 1932 and 1968. It is estimated that over 3,000 people suffered various deformities, severe mercury poisoning symptoms or death from what became known as Minamata disease.

The tobacco plant readily absorbs and accumulates heavy metals such as mercury from the surrounding soil into its leaves. These are subsequently inhaled during tobacco smoking. While mercury is a constituent of tobacco smoke, studies have largely failed to discover a significant correlation between smoking and Hg uptake by humans compared to sources such as occupational exposure, fish consumption, and amalgam tooth fillings.

Sediment contamination

Sediments within large urban-industrial estuaries act as an important sink for point source and diffuse mercury pollution within catchments. A 2015 study of foreshore sediments from the Thames estuary measured total mercury at 0.01 to 12.07 mg/kg with mean of 2.10 mg/kg and median of 0.85 mg/kg (n=351). The highest mercury concentrations were shown to occur in and around the city of London in association with fine grain muds and high total organic carbon content. The strong affinity of mercury for carbon rich sediments has also been observed in salt marsh sediments of the River Mersey mean of 2 mg/kg up to 5 mg/kg. These concentrations are far higher than those shown in salt marsh river creek sediments of New Jersey and mangroves of Southern China which exhibit low mercury concentrations of about 0.2 mg/kg.

Occupational exposure

Due to the health effects of mercury exposure, industrial and commercial uses are regulated in many countries. The World Health Organization, OSHA, and NIOSH all treat mercury as an occupational hazard, and have established specific occupational exposure limits. Environmental releases and disposal of mercury are regulated in the U.S. primarily by the United States Environmental Protection Agency.

Fish

Fish and shellfish have a natural tendency to concentrate mercury in their bodies, often in the form of methylmercury, a highly toxic organic compound of mercury. Species of fish that are high on the food chain, such as shark, swordfish, king mackerel, bluefin tuna, albacore tuna, and tilefish contain higher concentrations of mercury than others. Because mercury and methylmercury are fat soluble, they primarily accumulate in the viscera, although they are also found throughout the muscle tissue. Mercury presence in fish muscles can be studied using non-lethal muscle biopsies. Mercury present in prey fish accumulates in the predator that consumes them. Since fish are less efficient at depurating than accumulating methylmercury, methylmercury concentrations in the fish tissue increase over time. Thus species that are high on the food chain amass body burdens of mercury that can be ten times higher than the species they consume. This process is called biomagnification. Mercury poisoning happened this way in Minamata, Japan, now called Minamata disease.

Cosmetics
Some facial creams contain dangerous levels of mercury. Most contain comparatively non-toxic inorganic mercury, but products containing highly toxic organic mercury have been encountered.

Effects and symptoms of mercury poisoning

Toxic effects include damage to the brain, kidneys and lungs. Mercury poisoning can result in several diseases, including acrodynia (pink disease), Hunter-Russell syndrome, and Minamata disease.

Symptoms typically include sensory impairment (vision, hearing, speech), disturbed sensation and a lack of coordination. The type and degree of symptoms exhibited depend upon the individual toxin, the dose, and the method and duration of exposure. Case–control studies have shown effects such as tremors, impaired cognitive skills, and sleep disturbance in workers with chronic exposure to mercury vapor even at low concentrations in the range 0.7–42 μg/m3. A study has shown that acute exposure (4–8 hours) to calculated elemental mercury levels of 1.1 to 44 mg/m3 resulted in chest pain, dyspnea, cough, hemoptysis, impairment of pulmonary function, and evidence of interstitial pneumonitis. Acute exposure to mercury vapor has been shown to result in profound central nervous system effects, including psychotic reactions characterized by delirium, hallucinations, and suicidal tendency. Occupational exposure has resulted in broad-ranging functional disturbance, including erethism, irritability, excitability, excessive shyness, and insomnia. With continuing exposure, a fine tremor develops and may escalate to violent muscular spasms. Tremor initially involves the hands and later spreads to the eyelids, lips, and tongue. Long-term, low-level exposure has been associated with more subtle symptoms of erethism, including fatigue, irritability, loss of memory, vivid dreams and depression.

Treatment
Research on the treatment of mercury poisoning is limited. Currently available drugs for acute mercurial poisoning include chelators N-acetyl-D, L-penicillamine (NAP), British Anti-Lewisite (BAL), 2,3-dimercapto-1-propanesulfonic acid (DMPS), and dimercaptosuccinic acid (DMSA). In one small study including 11 construction workers exposed to elemental mercury, patients were treated with DMSA and NAP. Chelation therapy with both drugs resulted in the mobilization of a small fraction of the total estimated body mercury. DMSA was able to increase the excretion of mercury to a greater extent than NAP.

Regulations

International
140 countries agreed in the Minamata Convention on Mercury by the United Nations Environment Programme (UNEP) to prevent emissions. The convention was signed on 10 October 2013.

United States
In the United States, the Environmental Protection Agency is charged with regulating and managing mercury contamination. Several laws give the EPA this authority, including the Clean Air Act, the Clean Water Act, the Resource Conservation and Recovery Act, and the Safe Drinking Water Act. Additionally, the Mercury-Containing and Rechargeable Battery Management Act, passed in 1996, phases out the use of mercury in batteries, and provides for the efficient and cost-effective disposal of many types of used batteries. North America contributed approximately 11% of the total global anthropogenic mercury emissions in 1995.

The United States Clean Air Act, passed in 1990, put mercury on a list of toxic pollutants that need to be controlled to the greatest possible extent. Thus, industries that release high concentrations of mercury into the environment agreed to install maximum achievable control technologies (MACT). In March 2005, the EPA promulgated a regulation that added power plants to the list of sources that should be controlled and instituted a national cap and trade system. States were given until November 2006 to impose stricter controls, but after a legal challenge from several states, the regulations were struck down by a federal appeals court on 8 February 2008. The rule was deemed not sufficient to protect the health of persons living near coal-fired power plants, given the negative effects documented in the EPA Study Report to Congress of 1998. However newer data published in 2015 showed that after introduction of the stricter controls mercury declined sharply, indicating that the Clean Air Act had its intended impact.

The EPA announced new rules for coal-fired power plants on 22 December 2011. Cement kilns that burn hazardous waste are held to a looser standard than are standard hazardous waste incinerators in the United States, and as a result are a disproportionate source of mercury pollution.

European Union
In the European Union, the directive on the Restriction of the Use of Certain Hazardous Substances in Electrical and Electronic Equipment (see RoHS) bans mercury from certain electrical and electronic products, and limits the amount of mercury in other products to less than 1000 ppm. There are restrictions for mercury concentration in packaging (the limit is 100 ppm for sum of mercury, lead, hexavalent chromium and cadmium) and batteries (the limit is 5 ppm). In July 2007, the European Union also banned mercury in non-electrical measuring devices, such as thermometers and barometers. The ban applies to new devices only, and contains exemptions for the health care sector and a two-year grace period for manufacturers of barometers.

Norway
Norway enacted a total ban on the use of mercury in the manufacturing and import/export of mercury products, effective 1 January 2008. In 2002, several lakes in Norway were found to have a poor state of mercury pollution, with an excess of 1 μg/g of mercury in their sediment.
In 2008, Norway's Minister of Environment Development Erik Solheim said: "Mercury is among the most dangerous environmental toxins. Satisfactory alternatives to Hg in products are
available, and it is therefore fitting to induce a ban."

Sweden
Products containing mercury were banned in Sweden in 2009.

Denmark
In 2008, Denmark also banned dental mercury amalgam, except for molar masticating surface fillings in permanent (adult) teeth.

Mercury in art
Mercury Fountain, Alexander Calder's 1937 sculpture, is displayed behind glass at the Fundació Joan Miró in Barcelona, to control toxic mercury vapors.

Cloud Gate, a 2006 public sculpture by Anish Kapoor in Chicago, Illinois, was inspired by liquid mercury.

See also
 Mercury pollution in the ocean
 Red mercury
 COLEX process (isotopic separation)

References

Further reading

External links

 Chemistry in its element podcast (MP3) from the Royal Society of Chemistry's Chemistry World: Mercury
 Mercury at The Periodic Table of Videos (University of Nottingham)
 Centers for Disease Control and Prevention – Mercury Topic
 EPA fish consumption guidelines
 Hg 80 Mercury
 Material Safety Data Sheet – Mercury
 Stopping Pollution: Mercury – Oceana
 Natural Resources Defense Council (NRDC): Mercury Contamination in Fish guide – NRDC
 NLM Hazardous Substances Databank – Mercury
 BBC – Earth News – Mercury "turns" wetland birds such as ibises homosexual
 Changing Patterns in the Use, Recycling, and Material Substitution of Mercury in the United States United States Geological Survey
 Thermodynamical data on liquid mercury.
 

 
Chemical elements
Coolants
Endocrine disruptors
Native element minerals
Neurotoxins
Nuclear reactor coolants
Occupational safety and health
Transition metals